The 2013–14 Amlin Challenge Cup pool stage will be the opening stage of the 18th season of the European Challenge Cup, the second-tier competition for European rugby union clubs. The opening round of matches will be on 10–13 October 2013 and the closing round on 16–19 January 2014.

Twenty teams will participate in this phase of the competition; they are divided into five pools of four teams each, with each team playing the others home and away. Competition points are earned using the standard bonus point system. The pool winners advance to the knockout stage, where they will be joined by three entrants from the Heineken Cup pool stage. The quarter-finalists will then participate in a knockout tournament that ultimately ends with the final at the Arms Park in Cardiff on Friday 23 May 2014.

Results
The draw for the pool stage took place on 5 June 2013 at the Aviva Stadium in Dublin.  The dates and times of the first 4 rounds were announced on 27 July 2013.  Lusitanos XV replaced Olympus Madrid on 2 September 2013, as the latter withdrew due to financial issues.

All times are local to the game location.

{| class="wikitable"
|+ Key to colours
|-
| style="background:#cfc;"|    
|Winner of each pool advances to quarterfinals. Seed # in parentheses.
|}

Pool 1

Pool 2

Pool 3

Pool 4

Pool 5

See also
European Challenge Cup
2013–14 Heineken Cup

References

External links
Official ERC website

pool stage
2013–14